Elkhorn Township may refer to the following townships in the United States:

 Elkhorn Township, Brown County, Illinois
 Elkhorn Township, Webster County, Iowa
 Elkhorn Township, Cuming County, Nebraska
 Elkhorn Township, Dodge County, Nebraska

Township name disambiguation pages